Carrick-on-Suir railway station serves the town of Carrick-on-Suir, County Tipperary in Ireland.

It has a weekday passenger service of two trains to Waterford and two to Limerick Junction. There is no Sunday service. Until 19 January 2013 (inclusive) there were three trains each way. However the late-morning Waterford to Limerick Junction and early-afternoon Limerick Junction to Waterford trains are now discontinued.

The station consists of two platforms, a waiting room, toilets and small car park at present free for rail passengers. The second platform, on which the signal cabin is located, was served by a passing loop until November 2013.

There is also a siding, used by the Irish Traction Group to store preserved diesel locomotives.

History
The station opened on 15 April 1853.

Statistics
Passenger statistics are compiled by the National Transport Authority. The passenger decline is due to unreliable timetables.

See also
 List of railway stations in Ireland

References

External links

 Irish Rail Carrick-on-Suir Station website
 Irish Traction Group site about their Carrick on Suir base
 South Tipperary Rail & Bus Website

Iarnród Éireann stations in County Tipperary
Railway stations opened in 1853
Carrick-on-Suir
Railway stations in the Republic of Ireland opened in 1853